Benny Rebel, born Bahman Vafaeinejad (born August 13, 1968 in Arak, Iran), is an Iranian-German photographer known for his extreme close-up portraits of dangerous wildlife of Africa by approaching within feet of the animals.

In 1987, Rebel immigrated to Hannover, Germany. His interest in wildlife conservation led to his involvement with the environmental advocacy group Greenpeace.

He has taken adventures in many countries, including South Africa, Namibia, Zimbabwe, Zambia, Rwanda, Kenya and Uganda, as well as Iran, Turkey, India, Sri Lanka, Mexico, Costa Rica, the Galápagos Islands, Ecuador, the Dominican Republic, the United States and some European countries.

Benny Rebel was awarded two gold medals by Trierenberg Super Circuit of Austria in 2002 and 2003.

Works

Exhibitions
 [Too Beautiful to Die] (2000), in Hannover; comprising images of threatened wildlife he encountered mostly in South Africa.
 [Endangered African Beauties] (2003), at Galerie im Keller in Hannover

TV shows
He has appeared in many TV shows of NDR, ARD, Arte, BR, MDR, RBB, RTL, Sat.1, SWR, WDR, ZDF, as well as Iranian channels IR 2 and IRIB Aftab.

Documentary films
In Search of the King Cheetah (2006): a 60-minute documentation produced by NDR about Benny Rebel's work in South Africa.
Wild Iran (2007): in 2006, Benny Rebel returned to Iran and produced this documentary about the wildlife of Iran.
In 2007, Benny Rebel produced a documentary film about the extinction of the Bengal tiger in India
In 2012, the German TV chains "ZDF / ARTE" produced two 45-minutes documentary films with Benny Rebel in Iran. This was a coproduction with following TV channels: WDR, BR, ORF and ARD.

Books
 [Untamed] (2006), Munich: Herbig, : a book of his images from Africa and the Galápagos Islands; preface of the book is written by Heinz Sielmann.
 [Wildlife of Africa in 3D] (2007), Terra Magica, : featured images of African animals captured by using three-dimensional photographic technology.
 [My Wilderness Adventure: Experiences of a Wildlife Photographer] (2010), Terra Magica, 240 pages
 [Image Design] (2010), : a book of photography tips in 80 pages with 145 photos.

Awards
2002 Trierenberg Super Circuit, Austria, gold medal, Nature category
2003 Trierenberg Super Circuit, Austria, gold medal, Nature category

References

External links

Living people
1968 births
People from Arak, Iran
Iranian photographers
Photographers from Lower Saxony
Nature photographers
Photography in South Africa
People associated with Greenpeace
Iranian emigrants to Germany